Henny Backus (born Henrietta Kaye, March 21, 1911 – December 9, 2004) was a Broadway showgirl in the 1930s whose stage credits include Orson Welles's Horse Eats Hat. She was the wife of actor and comedian Jim  Backus.

Career

Henrietta Kaye was born in Brooklyn on March 21, 1911. She studied sculpture at Cooper Union, but she preferred working in the theater and appeared in Broadway musicals during the 1930s. She had the role of Bee in the Broadway play Chrysalis (1932). Working as Henriette Kaye, she was a member of the Federal Theatre Project. Described by The New York Times as "a leggy redhead with a droll sense of humor", she appeared in Orson Welles's Project 891 production Horse Eats Hat (1936), a surrealistic farce co-starring Welles, Joseph Cotten, Hiram Sherman and Arlene Francis. Her husband, Nat Karson, designed the sets and costumes.

Kaye married actor and comedian Jim Backus in 1943. The couple co-starred in the 1960s television series Blondie, and they performed together once on Gilligan's Island, in the sitcom's second-season episode "Gilligan's Mother-In-Law" (1965). She appeared too with her husband in a season-five episode of The Love Boat.

Henny and Jim Backus co-authored several humorous books, including What Are You Doing After the Orgy? (1962), Only When I Laugh (1965), Backus Strikes Back (1984), and Forgive Us Our Digressions (1988). Henny also wrote Care for the Caretaker (1999), documenting her husband's battle with Parkinson's disease and offering practical solutions for those facing such dilemmas.

Jim Backus died from complications of pneumonia in 1989.  Fifteen years later, Henny died at the age of 93 following a series of strokes.  She was buried next to her husband in Westwood Village Memorial Park Cemetery in Los Angeles.

References

External links

1911 births
2004 deaths
American stage actresses
American humorists
20th-century American memoirists
Burials at Westwood Village Memorial Park Cemetery
Federal Theatre Project people
American women memoirists
Women humorists
20th-century American actresses
20th-century American people
21st-century American women